Bear Branch is an unincorporated community in north central Linn County, in the U.S. state of Missouri.

The community is on Missouri Route V approximately seven miles east of Purdin.

History
A post office called Bear Branch was established in 1871, and remained in operation until 1887. The community took its name from nearby Bear Branch creek.

References

Unincorporated communities in Linn County, Missouri
Unincorporated communities in Missouri